John Lewis Hervey (1870 – December 31, 1947) was an American writer known as a prominent authority on Thoroughbred horses.   Hervey was born in Jefferson, Ohio.  In 1890 he moved to Chicago and began writing on horses, using the names "Salvator" and "Volunteer".  He also published a history of Thoroughbred horses for the New York Jockey Club and the American Trotter (1947).  Hervey died in Chicago on December 31, 1947.

References

 	

1870 births
1947 deaths
Horse racing writers and broadcasters
People from Jefferson, Ohio